Shishi is an Israeli news and current affairs program, broadcast every Friday evening on Channel 10. From 2006-2009 the program was hosted by Raviv Drucker and Ofer Shelah. It was hosted by Alon Ben David and Tali Moreno beginning in 2013.

References

Channel 10 (Israeli TV channel) original programming
2006 Israeli television series debuts